John Simpson Chisum (August 16, 1824 – December 23, 1884) was a wealthy cattle baron in the American West in the mid-to-late 19th century. He was born in Hardeman County, Tennessee, and moved with his family to the Republic of Texas in 1837, later finding work as a building contractor. He also served as county clerk in Lamar County. He was of Scottish, English, and Welsh descent.

In 1854, Chisum became engaged in the cattle business and became one of the first to send his herds to New Mexico Territory. He obtained land along the Pecos River by right of occupancy and eventually became the owner of a large ranch in the Bosque Grande, about forty miles south of Fort Sumner, with over 100,000 head of cattle. In 1866-67, Chisum formed a partnership with cattlemen Charles Goodnight and Oliver Loving to assemble and drive herds of cattle for sale to the United States Army in Fort Sumner and Santa Fe, New Mexico, to provide cattle to miners in Colorado as well as provide cattle to the Bell Ranch.

Feuds in New Mexico
Chisum staked his grazing territory alongside the Pecos River, releasing many cattle, which also got him in feud with various smaller ranchers and outlaws, paving his involvement in both the Pecos War and the Lincoln County War. He was a business associate of Alexander McSween, an influential figure in the Lincoln County War. His employee and close friend, James Pepper (who was born in Texas to parents from England) was also closely associated with him during this era. When Lew Wallace took office as the appointed Territorial Governor of New Mexico on October 1, 1878, he proclaimed an amnesty for all those involved in the bitter feud. When Billy the Kid surrendered to the authorities, he was told he would be charged with the death of Sheriff William J. Brady, violating the amnesty.

Billy the Kid escaped from prison and went to see Chisum to collect a $500 debt. Chisum refused payment, claiming that he instead had given the Kid horses, supplies, and protection over the years. The Kid promised to steal $500 worth of cattle from Chisum to make up this sum. The Kid's gang also stole from other cattlemen and became a serious problem in Lincoln County. Ultimately, Chisum, Pecos Valley rancher Joseph C. Lea, and James Dolan sought somebody capable of hunting down the Kid and either arresting or killing him. In 1880, they persuaded Pat Garrett, a former buffalo hunter and cowboy, reformed part-time rustler, small rancher, and Billy the Kid’s one-time friend,  to run for the office of Lincoln County sheriff. His specific task, if elected, was to apprehend Billy’s gang, consisting of Dave Rudabaugh, Billy Wilson, Tom O'Folliard, and Charlie Bowdre.

In December 1880, Garrett shot O'Folliard and Bowdre dead. Billy the Kid, Rudabaugh, and Wilson were later captured or killed by Garrett.

Death and legacy
Chisum died in Eureka Springs, Arkansas, on December 23, 1884, aged 60, due to complications from surgery to remove a growth from his jaw. He was unmarried and left his estate worth $500,000 to his brothers Pitzer and James. Chisum had an extended family living with him at the South Springs ranch in Roswell, and this family, along with hired help, often numbered two dozen at the main ranch headquarters. Chisum's niece Sallie Lucy Chisum, daughter of his brother James, became a beloved figure in the area, where she lived until 1934. Sallie kept a diary or journal that has historical importance because of its references to Billy the Kid and Pat Garrett, both of whom she knew. She and John Chisum are honored by statues to their memory in Artesia and Roswell, New Mexico. In 1958, he was inducted into the Hall of Great Westerners of the National Cowboy & Western Heritage Museum. John Chisum fathered 2 daughters with his slave mistress Jensie. When Chisum moved west, he took Jensie and their two daughters to Bonham, Texas; bought them a house and left money to care for the girls. His eldest daughter Almeada “Meady” Chisum went on to marry Bob Jones, prominent rancher of Southlake, Texas. Among their grandchildren is Dr. William LaRue Jones, Professor Emeritus of Orchestral Studies at the University of Iowa and current music director of the Ottumwa Symphony Orchestra.

See also

 Empire Ranch

References

External links
Lily Klasner papers, MSS 1963 at L. Tom Perry Special Collections, Brigham Young University. Includes Klasner's research notes on Chisum's biography.

American cattlemen
Cowboys
1824 births
1884 deaths
American poker players
People of the American Old West
People of the New Mexico Territory
People from Eureka Springs, Arkansas
People from Hardeman County, Tennessee
People from Lamar County, Texas
People from Lincoln County, New Mexico
Immigrants to the Republic of Texas
Ranchers from New Mexico
Members of the Odd Fellows